Douglas Edward Lea (February 2, 1910 – June 16, 1947) was an experimental physicist working primarily in the field of radiobiology. He started working at the Cavendish Laboratory at University of Cambridge in the 1930s, and in time moved from nuclear physics to focus on biology. After obtaining his PhD from Cambridge, he worked at Strangeways Laboratory, then at the Royal College of Surgeons between 1942 and 1946.

Lea published his influential book, The Actions of Radiation of Living Cells, in 1946, the year before he died in an accident. Lea was a major contributor to the target theory of cell death caused by ionising radiation.

A memorial lecture in his name has been given biennially since 1948. He was a close friend of fellow radiobiology pioneer, Louis Harold Gray.

References

Radiobiologists
Cavendish Laboratory
British physicists
1910 births
1947 deaths